Noli is a commune of Liguria, Italy.

Noli may also refer to:

People

Given name 
 Noli de Castro (born 1949), 14th Vice President of the Philippines and news anchor
 Noli Eala, former commissioner of the Philippine Basketball Association
 Noli Francisco (1941–2017), American poker player
 Noli Locsin (born 1971), Filipino basketball player

Surname 
 Andrea Noli (born 1972), Mexican actress
 António de Noli (born 1415 or 1419), Genoese nobleman and first Governor of Cape Verde
 Fan S. Noli (1882–1965), Albanian scholar, politician, and founder of the Albanian Orthodox Church

Countries 

 Republic of Noli, former Italian republic

Other uses 
 Noli railway station, in Pakistan

See also 
 Noli me tangere (disambiguation)